

Belgium
 Belgian Congo – Léon Pétillon, Governor-General of Belgian Congo (1952–1958)

France
 French Somaliland – Numa François Henri Sadoul, Governor of French Somaliland (1950–1954)
 Guinea – Paul Henri Sirieix, Governor of Guinea (1951–1953)

Portugal
 Angola – José Agapito de Silva Carvalho, High Commissioner of Angola (1948–1955)

United Kingdom
 Aden – Sir Tom Hickinbotham, Governor of Aden (1951–1956)
 Malta Colony – Gerald Creasy, Governor of Malta (1949–1954)
 Northern Rhodesia – Sir Gilbert McCall Rennie, Governor of Northern Rhodesia (1948–1954)

Colonial governors
Colonial governors
1952